A distyle is a small temple-like structure with two columns. By extension,  a distyle can also mean a distyle in antis, the original design of the Greek temple, where two columns are set between two antae.

See also
Prostyle
Amphiprostyle
Peristyle

Ancient Greek architecture